Tom Donaghy is an American playwright who works in television and film.

Biography 
Tom Donaghy was born in Philadelphia, Pennsylvania. He attended Hofstra University for two years before transferring to the New York University Tisch School of the Arts Undergraduate Drama Program. His teachers at NYU included Edward Albee, Wendy Wasserstein, Julian Beck and Judith Malina, Jean-Claude van Itallie, Ron Argelander, Anne Bogart, John Guare, Gregory Mosher, William H. Macy and David Mamet.

During this time he work/studied with Richard Schechner in the Department of Performance Studies, and interned at Mabou Mines, where he assisted JoAnne Akalaitis during post-production of her film Dead End Kids. He received a BFA in 1986.

Upon graduating, Donaghy was part of a group of students who founded Atlantic Theater Company in Chicago and Burlington, Vermont. The company then established itself in New York City as an off-Broadway acting ensemble.

Theater 
Donaghy’s first play, the one-act Down the Shore, was produced by The Eugene O’Neill National Playwrights Conference in Waterford, Connecticut. The play was directed by Amy Saltz with dramaturgy by Miranda Barry. It then premiered at The Goodman Theater in Chicago where it was directed by David Petrarca. The play had an Off-Broadway run at Atlantic where it was paired with Donaghy’s short play The Dadshuttle. Both plays were directed by William H. Macy.

Donaghy’s first full-length play, Northeast Local, had regional productions at Trinity Repertory and Seattle Repertory, before premiering at Lincoln Center Theater, where it was directed by Gerald Gutierrez with sets by John Lee Beatty costumes by Jane Greenwood. It was produced by André Bishop.

His next play, Minutes from the Blue Route was produced by New York Stage and Film before premiering off-Broadway at Atlantic Theater Company. Both productions were directed by David Warren, with sets by Derek McLane and costumes by Laura Bauer.

His plays From Above and Boys and Girls were produced by Tim Sanford at Playwrights Horizons, directed by David Warren and Gerald Gutierrez respectively. His play The Beginning of August premiered at South Coast Repertory before its New York production at Atlantic. Both productions were directed by Neil Pepe with sets by Scott Pask and costumes by Bauer. His play Eden Lane, although originally commissioned by Hartford Stage, premiered at La Jolla Playhouse in August 2003, directed by Des McAnuff, with sets by John Arnone, costumes by David Woolard and dramaturgy by Shirley Fishman.

Donaghy’s adaptation of Anton Chekhov’s The Cherry Orchard, based on a translation by Ronald Meyer, premiered at Atlantic where it was directed by Scott Zigler. The dramaturg was Christian Parker.

Subsequent productions of the plays have been produced by the Arden Theatre Company in Philadelphia, Philadelphia Theater Company, the Magic Theater in San Francisco, Dallas Theater Center and others.

Published plays 
Down the Shore, The Dadshuttle, Northeast Local, Minutes from the Blue Route, From Above, The Beginning of August, and Boys and Girls are published by Dramatist Play Service.

A collection, The Beginning of August and Other Plays, was published by Grove Press. The adaption of The Cherry Orchard was published by Broadway Play Publishing.

Teaching 
New York University’s Tisch School of the Arts. Lecture appearances at City University of New York, Columbia University, Dartmouth College, Temple University and The University of Pennsylvania.

Recognition 
He has received awards from the John Simon Guggenheim Memorial Foundation, the National Endowment for the Arts, Theater Communications Group, the Sloan Foundation, PEN American and the residencies MacDowell, Millay, Albee, and Berilla Kerr Foundations.

His theater work has been profiled by The New York Times, The Los Angeles Times, the Village Voice and others and he has written essays about theater for The New York Times and American Theater Magazine.

Film and Television 
Donaghy adapted his play The Dadshuttle as a short film, which he directed. The cinematographer was Ellen Kuras. The play Down the Shore was also adapted as a short film, directed by Maggie Kiley and produced by Kate Bayley. In 1999 he wrote and directed the feature film Story of a Bad Boy, produced by Jean Doumanian.  

In 2008 he began working in television. With Jerry Bruckheimer Television and Warner Bros. Television, he created and produced The Whole Truth for ABC. In 2019 he co-created, with Lee Daniels, the musical drama STAR for Fox Broadcasting Company.

References

External links
Tom Donaghy website

Living people
Tisch School of the Arts alumni
American television producers
American gay writers
Place of birth missing (living people)
Year of birth missing (living people)
LGBT television producers
American LGBT dramatists and playwrights
American male dramatists and playwrights
21st-century American dramatists and playwrights